Abel Ramón Caballero Álvarez (born 2 September 1946) is a Spanish professor of Economics and since June 2007, the current Mayor of Vigo, representing PSdeG-PSOE . Since 19 September 2015, he has also served as the president of the Spanish Federation of Municipalities and Provinces (FEMP).

Caballero had previously served in the Spanish Congress of Deputies representing A Coruña Province from 1982 to 1986 and Pontevedra Province from 1986 to 1997.

References

External links
Biography at Spanish Congress site

1946 births
Living people
Spanish Socialist Workers' Party politicians
Politicians from Galicia (Spain)
Members of the 2nd Congress of Deputies (Spain)
Members of the 3rd Congress of Deputies (Spain)
Members of the 4th Congress of Deputies (Spain)
Members of the 5th Congress of Deputies (Spain)
Members of the 6th Congress of Deputies (Spain)
Mayors of places in Galicia
People from Vigo
Spanish municipal councillors